Athlitikos Omilos Neos Asteras Rethymnou is a football club based in Sochora Rethymno Crete. Between 2006 - 2007 the group Asteras Rethymno was crowned champions of the 10th group of the Delta Ethniki and won its participation, for the first time in a professional league, competed in the Football League 2 the period from 2007 - 2009 without success

History
Neos Asteras Rethymno is one of the most historic football clubs of Rethymnon. Founded in 1945 by a company then young children (Gasparakis Anthony, Anthony Arampatzoglou, Simsiris Achilleas, Giachakis Anastasios and others). The first meeting was held on 25.02.1945 with President John Lymakis. The first name given by the first Board of Directors the newly established club was PAS Astir (Athletic Football Club Astir) and this in recognition of Asteras Gkyzis subsequent Asteras Exarchia was the club that gave assistance in material through a relative of Gasparakis Anthony. After sixteen years of successes and major victories (Crete emerged Cup, won PALMER, Irodotos, Ergotelis, Ionia, etc.), on 07/28/1961, after the general meeting, the members of the Star, decide on the merger of PAS Astir with Thunderbolt and creating Rethymniakos. A year later (July 4, 1962), re-founded the club, called AO Neos Asteras Rethymno. But in August 1967, the activity of the association is inactivated due to the junta. Neos Asteras Rethymnon reactivated seven years later (December 13, 1974), with the restoration of democracy in Greece and undistracted continues to actively participate in the process of locals football today. In these 70 years of life, the Asteras Rethymno has highlighted major players, and personalities. Asteras Rethymno made his first football steps and nurtured George Kokolakis who fought for a decade to Superleague Greece, with great career at Olympiakos Piraeus. On May 20, 2007, Asteras Rethymno, for the first time in history won the rise of the professional classes, having emerged champion in the 10th group of the Regional Championship Crete. In 2009 Asteras Rethymno Rethymno crowned champion for the 15th time in its history.

Players

Line Up

Academies
The academies of Asteras Rethymno are among the most famous in Crete and with many awards in Rethymno at all ages. Has over 250 children in academies.

Titles
1 Championship Delta Ethniki (2007)
15 Championships at A'Local League of Rethymno (1951, 1953, 1955, 1957, 1959,
1960, 1967, 1977, 1982, 1987,
1991, 1998, 2000, 2002, 2009)
11 Rethymno Cups (1951, 1953, 1957, 1958, 1959,
1978, 2000, 2001, 2003, 2005,
2006)
4 Rethymno Super Cups (1998, 2003, 2005, 2006)

External links
 Official Website

Football clubs in Rethymno
Football clubs in Crete
Association football clubs established in 1945
1945 establishments in Greece